Brezis is a surname. Notable people with the surname include:

Elise Brezis, French-Israeli economist, professor of Economics at Bar-Ilan University
Haïm Brezis (born 1944), French mathematician